Tore is a volcano located in the northern part of the island of Bougainville, Papua New Guinea. Violent Pleistocene eruptions produced two ignimbrite fans stretching west to the coast, and a 6 km by 9 km caldera. A post-caldera lava cone on the caldera's southern rim is the source of lava flows. Well-preserved features suggests a recent date for this cone and a nearby ash cone.

See also
 List of volcanoes in Papua New Guinea

References 
 

Mountains of Papua New Guinea
Volcanoes of Bougainville Island